Enzo Camille Alain Millot (born 17 July 2002) is a French professional footballer who plays as a midfielder for VfB Stuttgart.

Club career
On 30 July 2019, Millot signed his first professional contract with Monaco. Millot made his professional debut with Monaco in a 1–0 Ligue 1 loss to Brest on 4 October 2020.

On 14 August 2021, Millot signed a four-year-contract with VfB Stuttgart.

Personal life
Millot was born in France and is of Martiniquais and Malagasy descent. His father was a former amateur footballer.

Honours 
France U17
 FIFA U-17 World Cup third place: 2019

Individual
 UEFA European Under-17 Championship Team of the Tournament: 2019

References

External links

 
 FFF Profile

2002 births
Living people
Sportspeople from Eure-et-Loir
French footballers
France youth international footballers
Association football midfielders
AS Monaco FC players
VfB Stuttgart players
Ligue 1 players
Championnat National 2 players
French expatriate footballers
Expatriate footballers in Germany
French people of Martiniquais descent
French sportspeople of Malagasy descent
Footballers from Centre-Val de Loire
French expatriate sportspeople in Germany